SM Town Live 2022: SMCU Express is a concert tour by SM Town. The tour commenced with one show in Suwon, South Korea, and then continued with three shows in Tokyo, Japan. The concert is SM Town's first in-person concert in almost three years since SM Town Live 2019 in Tokyo (2019), and the first South Korea concert in five years since SM Town Live World Tour VI (2017–2018).

Background 
SM Town is the name for the artists under Korean record label SM Entertainment. Normally, each year the company organizes their artists to come together and perform a four to six hours long concert that tours around the Asian continent. However, due to the COVID-19 pandemic that started from the beginning of 2020, the usual in-person concert had to halt for a while, including the annual SM Town concert. Instead, during the New Year season of 2021 and 2022, SM Entertainment held two online free concerts, SM Town Live Culture Humanity (2021) and SM Town Live 2022: SMCU Express at Kwangya (2022).

On April 25, 2022, SM Entertainment announced that SM Town would hold a two-day concert at Tokyo Dome on August 27 and 28. It was the first SM Town concert held in Japan in three years. Alongside the announcement, an lineup consisting of Kangta, BoA, TVXQ, Super Junior, Taeyeon, Hyoyeon, Shinee, Suho, Chen, Kai, Red Velvet, NCT, Aespa, Raiden, and Kinjo was released. On June 23, an additional date was released since the previous two sold out. The concert was held for three days from the 27th to the 29th.

On June 30, 2022, SM Entertainment announced that SM Town would hold a concert at the Suwon World Cup Stadium in Suwon, South Korea, on August 20. It was their first in-person concert held in South Korea since 2017. The initial lineup included Kangta, BoA, TVXQ, Super Junior, Taeyeon, Hyoyeon, Red Velvet, Kai, Suho, Chen, Key, Minho, Onew, NCT, Aespa, Raiden and Kinjo. Girls' Generation, Xiumin, D.O., Got the Beat, Imlay and J.E.B. were also included in a final lineup released on July 12. Tickets were put on sale on Yes24 on July 26 for fan club members, while regular ticket reservations were set to start on July 28. The concert was streamed through KNTV and Beyond Live. Tickets were put on sale on the SM Town & Store website on August 2.

Critical reception 
Hong Dam-young of The Korea Herald wrote positively about the concert in Tokyo, saying it "successfully recaptured the spirit of [SM's] early heyday". Hong appreciated the combining of various genres throughout the performances and highlighted Super Junior among all the artists, praising their ability to "break down the language barrier". Hong concluded saying: "It was undeniable: SM is still a key player, and a home to some of the biggest and most cutting-edge musicians in the scene".

Performers

Set lists

Tour dates

Notes

References 

SM Town concert tours
2022 concert tours
Beyond Live
K-pop concerts